Bhandara ( bhandara) lies in the eastern part of Chitwan District in Bagmati Province of southern Nepal. It is a ward of Rapti Municipality, formally Village development committee.

At the time of the 2011 Nepal census it had a population of 16,121 people (7,529 male; 8,592 female) living in 3,489 individual households.

References

Populated places in Chitwan District
Village development committees (Nepal)